Marieke Katherine D'Cruz (née Guehrer; born 9 February 1986) is an Australian swimmer who is the former world record holder in the 50 metres  butterfly short course. She clocked 24.99 seconds

After her breakout meet in late 2008, D'Cruz broke her personal best times in several events, also breaking the short course 50 m butterfly world record. At the 2009 Telstra Aus trials, she earned an individual spot in the 100 m freestyle clocking 54.28 along with a spot on the 4×100 m freestyle relay team. The next day she clocked 25.60 s in the 50 m Butterfly, easily making the qualifying time and becoming the third fastest in history in that event, after some thunderous times posted in the semi-finals, the fasted qualifiers failed to match their times in the final, and Guehrer won gold.

At the 2009 World Aquatics Championships, D'Cruz picked up her first medal on day one with a bronze medal in the 4×100 m freestyle relay. With a tremendously fast semi-finals in the 50 m butterfly, from lane 6 Guehrer caused an upset capturing gold.

At the 2010 Commonwealth Games, D'Cruz won silver in the 50m butterfly final to Francesca Halsall and won gold in the 4×100 m freestyle relay.

Career Best Times 
LONG COURSE (50m Pool)
50m butterfly– 25.48 (Commonwealth Record)
100m butterfly – 58.08
50m freestyle – 24.87
SHORT COURSE (25m Pool)
50m butterfly– 24.69 (Commonwealth Record)
50m freestyle – 23.74 (Commonwealth Record)
50m backstroke – 25.98 (Commonwealth Record)
50m butterfly 100m backstroke (Australian Record)

See also
 List of World Aquatics Championships medalists in swimming (women)
 List of Commonwealth Games medallists in swimming (women)
 World record progression 50 metres backstroke
 World record progression 50 metres butterfly

References

External links
 

1986 births
Living people
Australian people of German descent
Sportswomen from South Australia
Australian female freestyle swimmers
Australian female backstroke swimmers
Australian female butterfly swimmers
Swimmers at the 2004 Summer Olympics
Swimmers at the 2010 Commonwealth Games
Commonwealth Games gold medallists for Australia
Commonwealth Games silver medallists for Australia
World Aquatics Championships medalists in swimming
Medalists at the FINA World Swimming Championships (25 m)
World record setters in swimming
Sportspeople from Adelaide
Olympic swimmers of Australia
Commonwealth Games medallists in swimming
Universiade medalists in swimming
Universiade gold medalists for Australia
Universiade silver medalists for Australia
Medallists at the 2010 Commonwealth Games